Monika Herceg (born 1990, in Sisak) is a poet, playwright, editor, feminist and activist from the small village Pecki near Petrinja, Croatia. She was awarded multiple literature prizes. She is known for being a prominent young poet of the new generation and the most awarded young author in recent Croatian history, sometimes called a "literary sensation". She explores the topics of poverty, domestic violence, immigration, and class and gender inequalities.

Biography 
She grew up in small village Pecki, near Petrinja, where she studied Physics, first at University of Zagreb and then at the University of Rijeka. She currently lives, works as an editor and raises two kids in Zagreb.

“No one among our contemporary authors laughs like Monika Herceg; nor writes more sorrowful poems,” writes Miljenko Jergović, a Croatian novelist and essayist. The latter statement is especially true when it comes to Herceg’s debut poetry collection Initial Coordinates. The poems in the book portray the lives of women in rural Croatia throughout the twentieth century, whose stories of poverty and struggle are recounted in the voices of Herceg’s family members.

“There were no books in our house, and paper was only used to light the fire,” Monika recalls. However, during her education in the Croatian town of Petrinja, her teachers soon recognized her talent and provided her the support her family could not. Herceg began writing poetry while working several jobs, all taken on to finance her study of physics.

Work and career 
In 2017, she won Goran for her book Početne koordinate(Initial Coordinates), the most important award for young authors in Croatia. As a result, the book was published in 2018 and, after that, she won the Kvirin Award, Fran Galović Slavić award and the international award Mostovi Struge.   

Initial Coordinates details Herceg’s return to the roots of her family and to those earliest, often traumatic, memories that have haunted her throughout her life.   

Her second book, Lovostaj (The Closed Season) (Jesenski i Turk, 2019.), was also a success: the manuscript won the Na vrh jezika award for the best unpublished poetry volume in 2018 and was published in 2019. Her third book, Vrijeme prije jezika (Time Before the Tongue) (Fraktura, 2020 ) won the Zvonko Milković award.   

At the international level, she won the second prize of the International Poetry Competition Castello di Duino that took place in Italy in 2016 and in 2018, she was granted the Bridges of Struga award during the Mostovi Struge festival in Macedonia  for best debut of a young author. In 2021 she won the Fierce Women award for her activism.

Her works have been translated in more than fifteen languages and they were published by some well-known magazines. She is part of Versopolis, an online platform dedicated to the promotion of young European authors. Her trilingual poetry books have been published in Lithuania and Austria. Another selection of her works have been published in French as Ciel sous tension, L’Ollave, 2019.

Her stories were also awarded with several regional and national awards, such as the Biber  award and the Lapis Histriae award.

Her drama script Gdje se kupuju nježnosti (Where to Buy Tenderness) was awarded by the Croatian National Theatre in Zagreb. Her play took off in 2021 and was a success. She was awarded for other drama scripts and also was granted the Marin Držić award the most, important drama script award in Croatia, for her drama Kill Yourself, Dear Dad,.

She is a member of the Croatia Writers Society and of the editorial board of their magazine.

Awards 

 2017 Goran award for young poets
 2017 Castello di Duino
 2017 Stevan Sremac award
 2018 Kvirin award for young poets
 2018 Fran Galović award for the best book
 2018 Slavić award for the best debut
 2018 Na vrh jezika award
 2018 Mostovi Struge international award for the best debut
 2019 Lapis Histrie award for the best short story
 2019 Biber award for the best short story
 2020 Zvonko Milković award for the best book
 2020 Priče s Balkana award for the best short drama script
 2020 National theatre in Zagreb award for the best drama script
 2021 Marin Držić drama script award
 2021 National theatre in Mostar award for best drama scripts
 2021 Fierce Woman award
 2022 Milo Bošković award

Works 
Početne koordinate (Initial Coordinates), Zagreb, 2018; SKUD Ivan Goran Kovačić and  Beograd; Književna radionica Rašić, 2019.

Lovostaj (Closed season), Zagreb: Jesenski i Turk, 2019 and Beograd; Kontrast, 2020.

Vrijeme prije jezika (Time Before the Tongue), Zagreb: Fraktura, 2020 and Beograd; Kontrast, 2021.

Gdje se kupuju nježnosti (2020.) (Where to Buy Tenderness), drama script

Mrtve ne treba micati (2020.) (Dead should not be moved), short drama script

Ubij se, tata (2020), (Kill yourself, dear Dad), drama script

Zakopana čuda (2020.) (Buried miracles), drama script

TRANSLATIONS

Ciel sous tension, trans. Martina Kramer, Paris: L’Ollave, 2019.Monika Herceg, Poetinis Druskininku ruduo, Vilnius: 2019.Wo Lyrik zuhause ist, trans. Jelena Dabić Austrija, 2020. 

Početni koordinati, trans. Đoko Zdraveski, PNV, Skopje, 2020.

Lovostoj., trans. Đoko Zdraveski, PNV, Skopje, 2021.

OÙ LES TENDRESSES S'ACHÈTENT-ELLES, Nicolas Raljević, Paris: Prozor Editions, 2021. 

Initial Coordinates, USA, Sandorf Passage, 2022.

Початкові координати, Krok Press, Ternopil, Galicia, Ukraine

References

Other websites 
 Monika Herceg homepage 
 Monika Herceg on Versepolis
 Biography on Fraktura publishing house
Interview on Croatian public TV: Nedeljom u 2
Poems in Asymptote Journal
Poems in Harvard Review
Poems in Poetry International

Croatian poets
Croatian women writers
Croatian women poets
Croatian bloggers
Croatian women bloggers
1990 births
Living people